The Gasparilla Island Lights are on Gasparilla Island in Boca Grande, Florida. The Port Boca Grande Lighthouse is on the southern tip of Gasparilla Island (located in Gasparilla Island State Park), and marked the Boca Grande Pass entrance to Charlotte Harbor.

Port Boca Grande Lighthouse
Port Boca Grande Lighthouse was first lit on December 31, 1890. It is a two-story frame dwelling raised on iron screw-piles, with the lantern placed in a cupola at the peak of the roof. The keeper lived in the lighthouse. A similar house (without a lantern) built next to it was the assistant keeper's dwelling.

The Port Boca Grande Lighthouse originally served ships transporting cattle from ports on Charlotte Harbor to Cuba. Phosphate ore from the Peace River area became an important cargo in the 1890s, and the construction of the Charlotte Harbor and Northern Railway to Port Boca Grande in 1909 resulted in increased traffic. Ship traffic to Port Boca Grande peaked at more than 30 ships a day during World War II, when Port Boca Grande served as a safe harbor for shipping in the Gulf.

The Gasparilla Island Light was deactivated in 1966, and abandoned by the Coast Guard in 1969. The buildings quickly deteriorated, and by 1970 beach erosion had exposed the screw-piles supporting the building, with waves breaking under the building at high tide. Two rock groins were built to protect the lighthouse, and sand was pumped in to build up the beach. Lee County took title of the lighthouse in 1972. On February 28, 1980, the lighthouse was placed on the National Register of Historic Places. Restoration work began in 1985, and in 1986 the light was recommissioned.

In 1988 the building and surrounding property were turned over to the State of Florida and became Gasparilla Island State Park. In 1999 the Historic Port Boca Grande Lighthouse and Museum opened to the public and is operated by the Barrier Island Parks Society 

The light is considered an Aid to Navigation and the lamp room is maintained by the U.S. Coast Guard Station St. Petersburg Aids to Navigation Team.

Gasparilla Island Light
The Gasparilla Island Light was originally constructed in 1885 to serve as the Delaware Breakwater Range Rear Light. Due to erosion, the light was decommissioned in 1918. The tower was disassembled in 1921, and reassembled on Gasparilla Island in 1927. However, the light was not lit until 1932, when it began service as the rear entrance range light for Port Boca Grande, with the front entrance range light approximately one mile off shore in the Gulf of Mexico.  When the two lights, which flashed at different rates, lined up, the ships' navigators knew it was time to turn to enter Boca Grande Pass.  Though the front range has been removed, the Boca Grande Rear Range Light remains in service today as the Gasparilla Island Light.  It is an Aid to Navigation and is maintained by the U.S. Coast Guard Station St. Petersburg Aids to Navigation Team.

The Gasparilla Island Light was decommissioned by the Coast Guard in 2014, and the lighthouse was transferred to the Barrier Islands Parks Society in 2016. The society commissioned a restoration of the lighthouse, including the installation of a replica of its original fresnel lens. The light was switched on again in 2018.

Notes

References
 McCarthy, Kevin M. (1990). Florida Lighthouses, Paintings by William L. Trotter, Gainesville, Florida: University of Florida Press. .
 National Park Service Inventory of Historic Light Stations - Florida Lighthouses - retrieved January 20, 2006
 Lee County listings at National Register of Historic Places
 
 Florida's Office of Cultural and Historical Programs
 Lee County listings
 Boca Grande Lighthouse Museum
 Gasparilla Island (Port Boca Grande) Lighthouse - retrieved June 29, 2008
 
 Amateur Radio Lighthouse Society (coordinates) - retrieved February 4, 2006

External links

 Port Boca Grande Lighthouse & Museum - Barrier Island Parks Society

Museums in Lee County, Florida
Lighthouse museums in Florida
Gasparilla Island
Lighthouses completed in 1890
Lighthouses completed in 1885
1932 establishments in Florida
1885 establishments in Florida
Lighthouses completed in 1932
Lighthouses on the National Register of Historic Places in Florida
National Register of Historic Places in Lee County, Florida